The MIT License is a permissive free software license originating at the Massachusetts Institute of Technology (MIT) in the late 1980s. As a permissive license, it puts only very limited restriction on reuse and has, therefore, high license compatibility.

Unlike copyleft software licenses, the MIT License also permits reuse within proprietary software, provided that all copies of the software or its substantial portions include a copy of the terms of the MIT License and also a copyright notice. , the MIT License was the most popular software license found in one analysis, continuing from reports in 2015 that the MIT License was the most popular software license on GitHub. 

Notable projects that use the MIT License include the X Window System, Ruby on Rails, Nim, Node.js, Lua, and jQuery. Notable companies using the MIT License include Microsoft (.NET), Google (Angular), and Meta (React).

License terms 
The MIT License has the identifier MIT in the SPDX License List. It is also known as the "Expat License". It has the following terms:

Copyright (c) <year> <copyright holders>

Permission is hereby granted, free of charge, to any person obtaining a copy
of this software and associated documentation files (the "Software"), to deal
in the Software without restriction, including without limitation the rights
to use, copy, modify, merge, publish, distribute, sublicense, and/or sell
copies of the Software, and to permit persons to whom the Software is
furnished to do so, subject to the following conditions:

The above copyright notice and this permission notice shall be included in all
copies or substantial portions of the Software.

THE SOFTWARE IS PROVIDED "AS IS", WITHOUT WARRANTY OF ANY KIND, EXPRESS OR
IMPLIED, INCLUDING BUT NOT LIMITED TO THE WARRANTIES OF MERCHANTABILITY,
FITNESS FOR A PARTICULAR PURPOSE AND NONINFRINGEMENT. IN NO EVENT SHALL THE
AUTHORS OR COPYRIGHT HOLDERS BE LIABLE FOR ANY CLAIM, DAMAGES OR OTHER
LIABILITY, WHETHER IN AN ACTION OF CONTRACT, TORT OR OTHERWISE, ARISING FROM,
OUT OF OR IN CONNECTION WITH THE SOFTWARE OR THE USE OR OTHER DEALINGS IN THE
SOFTWARE.

Variations

X11 License 
The X11 License, also known as the MIT/X Consortium License, is a variation on the MIT license, most known for its usage by the X Consortium. It has the identifier X11 in the SPDX License List.

It differs from the MIT License mainly by an additional clause restricting use of the copyright holders' name for advertisement.

It has the following terms:

Copyright (C) <date> <copyright holders>

Permission is hereby granted, free of charge, to any person obtaining a copy of this software and associated documentation files (the "Software"), to deal in the Software without restriction, including without limitation the rights to use, copy, modify, merge, publish, distribute, sublicense, and/or sell copies of the Software, and to permit persons to whom the Software is furnished to do so, subject to the following conditions:

The above copyright notice and this permission notice shall be included in all copies or substantial portions of the Software.

THE SOFTWARE IS PROVIDED "AS IS", WITHOUT WARRANTY OF ANY KIND, EXPRESS OR IMPLIED, INCLUDING BUT NOT LIMITED TO THE WARRANTIES OF MERCHANTABILITY, FITNESS FOR A PARTICULAR PURPOSE AND NONINFRINGEMENT. IN NO EVENT SHALL THE X CONSORTIUM BE LIABLE FOR ANY CLAIM, DAMAGES OR OTHER LIABILITY, WHETHER IN AN ACTION OF CONTRACT, TORT OR OTHERWISE, ARISING FROM, OUT OF OR IN CONNECTION WITH THE SOFTWARE OR THE USE OR OTHER DEALINGS IN THE SOFTWARE.

Except as contained in this notice, the name of <copyright holders> shall not be used in advertising or otherwise to promote the sale, use or other dealings in this Software without prior written authorization from <copyright holders>.

FPA License 
The FPA License, a less-permissive variation of the MIT License, has the identifier FPA in the SPDX License List. The main purpose of this license is to limit commercialization of the original software while still allowing educational and personal rights. It has the following terms:

Copyright <YEAR> <COPYRIGHT HOLDER>

Permission is hereby granted, free of charge, to any person obtaining a copy of this software and associated documentation files (the "Software"), to deal in the Software without limitation in the rights to use, copy, modify, merge, publish, and/ or distribute copies of the Software in an educational or personal context, subject to the following conditions: 

- The above copyright notice and this permission notice shall be included in all copies or substantial portions of the Software.

Permission is granted to sell and/ or distribute copies of the Software in a commercial context, subject to the following conditions:

- Substantial changes: adding, removing, or modifying large parts, shall be developed in the Software. Reorganizing logic in the software does not warrant a substantial change. 

THE SOFTWARE IS PROVIDED "AS IS", WITHOUT WARRANTY OF ANY KIND, EXPRESS OR IMPLIED, INCLUDING BUT NOT LIMITED TO THE WARRANTIES OF MERCHANTABILITY, FITNESS FOR A PARTICULAR PURPOSE AND NONINFRINGEMENT. IN NO EVENT SHALL THE AUTHORS OR COPYRIGHT HOLDERS BE LIABLE FOR ANY CLAIM, DAMAGES OR OTHER LIABILITY, WHETHER IN AN ACTION OF CONTRACT, TORT OR OTHERWISE, ARISING FROM, OUT OF OR IN CONNECTION WITH THE SOFTWARE OR THE USE OR OTHER DEALINGS IN THE SOFTWARE.

MIT No Attribution License 

The MIT No Attribution License, a variation of the MIT License, has the identifier MIT-0 in the SPDX License List. A request for legacy approval to the Open Source Initiative was filed on May 15, 2020, which led to a formal approval on August 5, 2020. By doing so, it forms a public-domain-equivalent license, the same way as BSD Zero Clause. It has the following terms:
MIT No Attribution

Copyright <YEAR> <COPYRIGHT HOLDER>

Permission is hereby granted, free of charge, to any person obtaining a copy of this
software and associated documentation files (the "Software"), to deal in the Software
without restriction, including without limitation the rights to use, copy, modify,
merge, publish, distribute, sublicense, and/or sell copies of the Software, and to
permit persons to whom the Software is furnished to do so.

THE SOFTWARE IS PROVIDED "AS IS", WITHOUT WARRANTY OF ANY KIND, EXPRESS OR IMPLIED,
INCLUDING BUT NOT LIMITED TO THE WARRANTIES OF MERCHANTABILITY, FITNESS FOR A
PARTICULAR PURPOSE AND NONINFRINGEMENT. IN NO EVENT SHALL THE AUTHORS OR COPYRIGHT
HOLDERS BE LIABLE FOR ANY CLAIM, DAMAGES OR OTHER LIABILITY, WHETHER IN AN ACTION
OF CONTRACT, TORT OR OTHERWISE, ARISING FROM, OUT OF OR IN CONNECTION WITH THE
SOFTWARE OR THE USE OR OTHER DEALINGS IN THE SOFTWARE.

Other variations  
The SPDX License List contains extra MIT license variations. Examples include:
 , a variation with an additional advertising clause.

Ambiguity and variants 
The name "MIT License" is potentially ambiguous. The Massachusetts Institute of Technology has been using many licenses for software since its creation; for example, MIT offers four licensing options for the FFTW C source code library, one of which is the GPL v2.0 and the other three of which are not open-source. The term "MIT License" has also been used to refer to the Expat License (used for the XML parsing library Expat) and to the X11 License (also called "MIT/X Consortium License"; used for X Window System by the MIT X Consortium). Furthermore, the "MIT License" as published by the Open Source Initiative is the same as the Expat License. Due to this differing use of terms, some prefer to avoid the name "MIT License". The Free Software Foundation argues that the term is misleading and ambiguous, and recommends against its use.

The X Consortium was dissolved late in 1996, and its assets transferred to The Open Group, which released X11R6 initially under the same license. The X11 License and the X11R6 "MIT License" chosen for ncurses by the Free Software Foundation both include the following clause, absent in the Expat License:

As of 2020, the successor to the X Window System is the X.Org Server, which is licensed under what is effectively the common MIT license, according to the X.org licensing page:
The X.Org Foundation has chosen the following format of the MIT License as the preferred format for code included in the X Window System distribution.   This is a slight variant of the common MIT license form published by the Open Source Initiative

The "slight variant" is the addition of the phrase "(including the next paragraph)" to the second paragraph of the license text, resulting in: "The above copyright notice and this permission notice (including the next paragraph) shall be included in all copies or substantial portions of the Software." This inclusion clarifies that the liability paragraph must also be included for the conditions of the license to be met.

The license-management features at popular source code repository GitHub, as well as its "Choose a License" service, do not differentiate between MIT/Expat license variants. The text of the Expat variant is presented as simply the "MIT License" (represented by the metadata tag mit).

Comparison to other licenses

BSD

The original BSD license also includes a clause requiring all advertising of the software to display a notice crediting its authors. This "advertising clause" (since disavowed by UC Berkeley) is present in the modified MIT License used by XFree86.

The University of Illinois/NCSA Open Source License combines text from both the MIT and BSD licenses; the license grant and disclaimer are taken from the MIT License.

The ISC license contains similarities to both the MIT and simplified BSD licenses, the biggest difference being that language deemed unnecessary by the Berne Convention is omitted.

GNU GPL
The GNU GPL is explicit about the patent grant an author would be giving when the code (or derivative work) is distributed, the MIT license does not discuss patents. Moreover, the GPL license impacts derivative works, but the MIT license does not.

Relation to patents 
Like the BSD license, the MIT license does not include an express patent license although some commentators state that the grant of rights covers all potential restrictions including patents. Both the BSD and the MIT licenses were drafted before the patentability of software was generally recognized under US law. The Apache License version 2.0 is a similarly permissive license that includes an explicit contributor's patent license.
Of specific relevance to US jurisdictions, the MIT license uses the terms "sell" and "use" that are also used in defining the rights of a patent holder in Title 35 of the United States Code section 154. This has been construed by some commentators as an unconventional but implicit license in the US to use any underlying patents.

Origins 

One of the originators of the MIT license, computer scientist Jerry Saltzer, has published his recollections of its early development, along with documentary evidence.

Reception 
, according to WhiteSource Software the MIT license was used in 27% of four million open source packages. , according to Black Duck Software and a 2015 blog from GitHub, the MIT license was the most popular open-source license, with the GNU GPLv2 coming second in their sample of repositories.

See also 

 Comparison of free and open-source software licenses
 ISC license – similar to the MIT license, but with language deemed unnecessary removed
 :Category:Software using the MIT license

References

Further reading

External links 
 MIT License variants
 The MIT License template (Open Source Initiative official site)
 Expat License
 X11 License

Free and open-source software licenses
Permissive software licenses
Mit License
X Window System
Massachusetts Institute of Technology